Delamain is a surname, and may refer to:

 Jacques Delamain (1874–1953), French naturalist
 Richard Delamaine or Delamain, the elder (before 1629 – before 1645), English mathematician
 Walter Sinclair Delamain (1862–1932), British Indian Army officer

See also
 Delamain (Cognac producer)